Gerhard Waldmann (born 28 May 1959) is a Swiss former freestyle swimmer. He competed in two events at the 1976 Summer Olympics.

References

External links
 

1959 births
Living people
Swiss male freestyle swimmers
Olympic swimmers of Switzerland
Swimmers at the 1976 Summer Olympics
Place of birth missing (living people)
20th-century Swiss people